Lars-Erik Molin (born May 7, 1956) is a Swedish former professional ice hockey centre. He spent 3 seasons in the National Hockey League with the Vancouver Canucks between 1981 and 1984, and spent the majority of his career with Modo Hockey in the Swedish Elitserien. Many of his finest accomplishments came for Team Sweden in international play, as he helped his country to several medal finishes at both the Winter Olympics and World Championships during the 1980s.

Playing career

A skilled playmaking forward who was strong on both the powerplay and penalty kill, Molin broke into the Modo senior squad in 1974–75 at the age of 18. Over the next few seasons, he emerged as one of the club's top two-way players, culminating in his selection to play for Sweden at the 1980 Winter Olympics in Lake Placid. At the Olympics, he was one of Sweden's top players, scoring 7 points in 7 games to help the team to a bronze medal. After another strong season with Modo the following year, Molin was signed by the Vancouver Canucks in 1981 to try his luck in the NHL, joining former Modo teammates Thomas Gradin and Lars Lindgren who were already established at the club.

Fresh off representing Sweden in the 1981 Canada Cup, Molin had a strong rookie season in Vancouver in 1981–82, scoring 15 goals and 46 points in 72 games to finish 6th in club scoring. In the playoffs, he fared even better, notching 11 points in 17 games in helping the Canucks in their run to the Stanley Cup finals.

Molin continued his solid play the following year, notching 12 goals and 39 points in 58 games. However, by 1983–84, he had become a fringe member of the squad and slumped to 6 goals and 13 points in only 42 appearances.

His NHL options at an end, Molin returned to Modo for 1984–85, and turned in the highest-scoring season of his Swedish league career, posting 57 points in just 32 games. He continued his strong play with the club for the next few seasons, and experienced another career highlight when he helped Sweden to a Gold Medal performance at the 1987 World Championships. He would also help Sweden to another bronze in the 1988 Winter Olympics in Calgary.

Now well into his 30s, Molin left Modo in 1988 and dropped down to the Swedish 2nd division with Örebro IK, where he spent the final 3 seasons of his career before retiring in 1991.

In 172 NHL appearances, Molin scored 33 goals and added 65 assists for 98 points. In 11 seasons in the top Swedish division with Modo, he added an additional 142 goals and 142 assists for 284 points in 335 appearances.

Following his career, Molin moved into coaching, with stints at IF Björklöven and Timrå IK.

Career statistics

Regular season and playoffs

International

External links

1956 births
Living people
Ice hockey players at the 1980 Winter Olympics
Ice hockey players at the 1988 Winter Olympics
Medalists at the 1980 Winter Olympics
Medalists at the 1988 Winter Olympics
Modo Hockey players
Olympic bronze medalists for Sweden
Olympic ice hockey players of Sweden
Olympic medalists in ice hockey
People from Örnsköldsvik Municipality
Storhamar Dragons coaches
Swedish expatriate ice hockey players in Canada
Swedish ice hockey coaches
Swedish ice hockey centres
Undrafted National Hockey League players
Vancouver Canucks players
Sportspeople from Västernorrland County